Munkácsi, Munkácsy: means "from Munkács" (Mukachevo):
 Mihály Munkácsy (1844–1900), Hungarian painter
 Martin Munkácsi (1896–1963), Hungarian-American photographer
 Erno Munkacsi (1896-1950), Hungarian jurist and writer

Hungarian-language surnames